Boettcher Estate, also known as Kalama Beach Park, is a former beachfront estate in Kailua, Honolulu County, Hawaii, with a house designed by Vladimir Ossipoff and landscape designed by Richard Tongg.

History 
The original home was designed for the Boettcher family in 1937 by Vladimir Ossipoff soon after he opened his own firm in Honolulu. After the city assumed ownership, the house and its  lot were restored and redesigned in several phases by Mason Architects of Honolulu to serve as Kalama Beach Park.

The area called Kalama (which means "The Torch" in the Hawaiian language) was Kailua's first housing tract, developed in 1925 by Harold K.L. Castle, who named it after Queen Kalama, the wife of King Kamehameha III, who previously owned the land in the Kailua area.

Mae Bleakie Boettcher, the widow of the original owner and trustee of the Denver-based Boettcher Foundation, sold her estate to the City and County of Honolulu. She died in 2001.

It became a municipal park in 1978 and was listed on the National Register of Historic Places in 2002.

References

Houses on the National Register of Historic Places in Hawaii
Hawaiian architecture
Houses in Honolulu County, Hawaii
National Register of Historic Places in Honolulu County, Hawaii